"" (Do not punish me in your anger) is a Lutheran hymn with a text written by Johann Georg Albinus as a paraphrase of Psalm 6. It was first printed with a formerly secular melody in Dresden in 1694. The song was included in 31 hymnals. The melody inspired musical settings both for organ and vocal works. The hymn was translated by Catherine Winkworth as "Not in anger, Mighty God", which appeared in 13 hymnals.

History and lyrics 
Johann Georg Albinus, a Lutheran minister in Naumburg, wrote the lyrics in seven stanzas. He paraphrased Psalm 6, which begins in the King James Version "O Lord, rebuke me not in thine anger, neither chasten me in thy hot displeasure.". The song was included in 31 hymnals.

It was translated several times, including Catherine Winkworth's "Not in anger, Mighty God", which appeared in 13 hymnals.

Melody and settings 
The melody was a dance tune in a manuscript dating from 1681 at the latest; it was printed with the sacred text in the collection Hundert ahnmutig- und sonderbar geistlicher Arien ("One hundred charming and remarkably spiritual Airs"), printed in Dresden in 1694.

The melody, known by the name "Wurttemburg", is sung in Anglican churches to the words Christ the Lord Is Risen Again!.

Organ 
Chorale preludes on the melody were composed by Georg Philipp Telemann, Johann Gottfried Walther, Gottfried August Homilius and Johann Ernst Bach, among others. Johann Georg Herzog, Johann Georg) wrote a prelude in 1876. Max Reger used the hymn in 1899 as the base of the second of two chorale fantasias, Zwei Choralphantasien, Op. 40, the first being based on "Wie schön leucht't der Morgenstern". He composed a chorale prelude as No. 37 of his 52 Chorale Preludes, Op. 67 in 1902.

Vocal 
Johann Sebastian Bach used the melody with the different hymn text "Mache dich, mein Geist, bereit" by Johann Burchard Freystein in his chorale cantata Mache dich, mein Geist, bereit BWV 115, changing the meter from common time to 6/8 in the opening chorale fantasia.

References

External links 
 
 Max Reger: Phantasie on the Chorale "Straf' mich nicht in deinem Zorn" Universal Edition 
 Rudolf Stier: Die Gesangbuchsnoth 1938, p. 103 

17th-century hymns in German
Lutheran hymns based on Psalms
Hymn tunes